Viva Yellow or the Davis Drive corridor line, is a Viva bus rapid transit line that serves Newmarket, Ontario, Canada on the Davis Drive Rapidway. This route is within York Region Transit's North Division, and is operated by Tok Transit under contract from York Region .

Route description 
Viva Yellow runs east–west on Davis Drive between Yonge Street and Highway 404. The route is less than 6 kilometres long, the shortest line in the Viva system.

There are seven stations on the Viva Yellow line. From west to east they are:

Rapidway

The majority of Viva Yellow's route runs along the Davis Drive Rapidway which is a bus-only lane that occupies the centre lanes of Davis Drive. The rapidway extends 2.6 kilometres from Yonge Street to the Southlake Regional Health Centre.

References

Yellow